Herjalf was a Polish gothic metal band from Jelenia Góra. Their music is enriched with characteristic symphonic metal elements and operatic voice of the vocalist.
The group came into being in summer 2000 of Julia (vocal) and Pawel (electric guitar) initiative. 
The group signed in April 2005 the contract with the Metal Mind Productions. In 2010 the band split-up.

Members 
 Julia Przyborowska - vocals
 Marcin Szylko - keyboards
 Paweł Kieżuć - electric guitar

Discography 
 Kiedy Topnieją Śniegi... (2001)
 Mrozem Uśpiona (2001)
 Northern Wind (2004)

Polish gothic metal musical groups
Polish symphonic metal musical groups
Polish musical trios
Musical groups established in 2000